Ocean Pointe is a skyscraper in Sham Tseng, New Territories, Hong Kong. The building was completed in 2001. It was designed by architectural firm DLN Architects & Engineers, and was developed by Kerry Properties Limited. Ocean Pointe, which stands as the 89th-tallest building in Hong Kong, is composed entirely of residential units, of which it contains 560.

History
The site was originally a Union Carbide depot developed in the 1960s. The complex was used for chemical storage, warehousing, and materials manufacturing. A latex manufacturing plant opened at the site in March 1977. In the 1990s, the company decided to relocate the Sham Tseng facilities to China, freeing up the site for sale and eventual residential redevelopment.

Kerry Properties won the 99,388 square foot site in a private tender in October 1994. The developer acquired the site in December 1994. In November 1997, the building plans for the new residential complex were approved by the Buildings Department. The first flats were sold in early 2001.

See also
 List of tallest buildings in Hong Kong

References

2001 establishments in Hong Kong
Kerry Properties
Private housing estates in Hong Kong
Residential buildings completed in 2001
Residential skyscrapers in Hong Kong
Sham Tseng